Stenehed is an Iron Age grave field (Steneheds gravfält) located about 1 km southwest of Hällevadsholm, Munkedal Municipality, Västra Götaland County,  Sweden.  The area contains about 45 graves, a stone circle, a stone ship, and a row of menhirs.

Originally, there were eleven or twelve menhirs at the site; today, there are nine. The tallest one is 3.3 m; the shortest - 1.4 m. They are placed in a row, according to their heights. In 1980, Swedish astronomer Curt Roslund (1930-2013)
suggested that they form an astronomical calendar, similar to Stonehenge in England.

References

Geography of Västra Götaland County
Archaeological sites in Sweden
Iron Age Europe
Burial monuments and structures
Germanic archaeological sites

Buildings and structures in Västra Götaland County